Artinian may refer to:

Mathematics
Objects named for Austrian mathematician Emil Artin (1898–1962)
Artinian ideal, an ideal I in R for which the Krull dimension of the quotient ring R/I is 0
Artinian ring, a ring which satisfies the descending chain condition on (one-sided) ideals
Artinian module, a module which satisfies the descending chain condition on submodules
Artinian group, a group which satisfies the descending chain condition on subgroups

People
Araz Artinian, Armenian-Canadian filmmaker and photographer
Artine Artinian (1907–2005), French literature scholar

See also
Descending chain condition
List of things named after Emil Artin